Thank You For the Demon is the eighth studio album by Swedish heavy metal band Mustasch. The album, released in January 2014, peaked at No. 5 on the Swedish albums chart.

Track listing

References

2014 albums
Mustasch albums